First National Bank Ghana Limited (FNBGL), commonly referred to as First National Bank Ghana, is a commercial bank in Ghana. It is licensed by the Bank of Ghana, the central bank and national banking regulator.

Location
The bank's headquarters are located on the 6th Floor of Accra Financial Centre, at the corner of Independence Avenue and Liberia Avenue, in the neighborhood called  West Ridge, in Accra, Ghana's capital city. The geographic coordinates of the bank's headquarters are:05°33'19.0"N, 0°12'05.0"W (Latitude:5.555278; Longitude:-0.201389).

Overview
First National Bank Ghana received a Universal banking license from the Bank of Ghana during the second half of 2015. It opened its first branch in Accra that same year. Beginning as a new greenfield operation, the bank plans to grow organically, with emphasis on digital applications, but mindful of the Ghanaian customers' desire for personal contact.

First National Bank Ghana is a subsidiary of First National Bank South Africa, which is the retail banking arm of FirstRand Group, a large financial services conglomerate, headquartered in South Africa and whose shares are listed on the JSE Limited, where they trade under the symbol: FSR.

Merger with Ghana Home Loan Bank
In September 2017, the Bank of Ghana directed all universal banks in Ghana to raise their minimum capital reserves from GHS:120 million (US$22.8 million) to GHS:400 million (US$73.4 million). First National Bank Ghana, with the support of its South African parent was able to meet the new minimums. However, Ghana Home Loan Bank (GHLB), an indigenous Ghanaian enterprise had challenges raising new capital. GHLB turned to FNB Ghana to discuss a merger or a buyout.

In May 2020, after regulatory approval from the Reserve Bank of South Africa and the Bank of Ghana, as well as consent from the shareholders of both banks, FNB Ghana acquired 100 percent  the shares of Ghana Home Loan Bank. As of 15 May 2020, the process to merge the operations of the two banks were underway. The merger was completed during the second quarter of 2020.

Governance
As of May 2020, the chairman of the seven-person board of directors is Stephan Claassen. Dominic Adu serves as the chief executive officer and leads a team of 11 senior managers in running the day-to-day affairs of the bank.

See also

 List of banks in Ghana

References

External links
 Official Website

Banks of Ghana
Accra
Banks established in 2015
FirstRand
Ghanaian companies established in 2015
Economy of Ghana
2015 establishments in Ghana